Changuito (born José Luis Quintana on January 18, 1948) is a Cuban percussionist.

Biography
Quintana was born in 1948 in Casablanca, Cuba. As a child he played professionally in bands such as Havana Jazz (joining aged 8), with his musician father, and with La Pandilla de los Cabezas de Perros. At the age of 13, he volunteered for military service and played in army bands, serving for three years, during which he also played in the jazz band Estrellas de Occidente. His mother died when he was 17 years old. In 1964 he joined the popular band Los Harmonicos, followed by a year in Sonorama 6, and spells as drummer in Souvinir and La Orchestra de Musica Moderna.

In 1970 he joined Los Van Van. They created the songo, where a combination of percussion instruments (timbales, cowbells, wood blocks, electronic drums, and cymbals) and hand techniques are characteristic.

He first recorded as a solo artist in 1992 and became recognized as a teacher of percussion. In 1996 Changuito was nominated for a Grammy award for his work with Carlos "Patato" Valdes and Orestes Vilato, produced by Greg Landau. This was his first recording in the United States and it highlighted many aspects of his playing overlooked in his Van Van recordings. He also played on a recording with Greg Landau accompanying Puerto Rican poet Piri Thomas along with Patato and Orestes. He has also contributed to recordings by Hilario Durán.
 
Changuito taught other percussionists including Giovanni Hidalgo, Karl Perazzo (of Santana), and Ginaski Wop (member of Bardamu project).

"Changuito special"
Although it had been done before by NYC based drummer/timbaleros like Jimmy "La Vaca" Santiag with La Playa Sextet and the José Curbelo Orchestra, Changuito popularized the technique in the 1970s of simultaneously playing timbale and bongo bell parts when he held the timbales chair in Los Van Van. This was done because of the elimination of the bongó player who would normally play the bongo bell (cencerro) in the montuno (vamp) sections of songs in Cuban based dance music.  The example below shows the combined bell patterns (written in a 2-3 clave sequence).

Selected Discography
 [1962] Cal Tjader - Cal Tjader Plays The Contemporary Music Of Mexico And Brasil
 [1994] Flora Purim - Speed of Light
 [1995] Orestes Vilató, Changuito, Patato - Ritmo Y Candela: Rhythm at the Crossroads
 [1997] Juan Formell and Los Van Van - De Cuba
 [1999] Fourth World (Airto Moreira and Flora Purim) - Last Journey
 [2000] Changuito / Cándido Fabré / Tiburon - El Muso Y Su Sonora
 [2000] Maraca - Descarga Total
 [2000] Airto Moreira - Homeless
 [2000] Brice Wassy - Shrine Dance
 [2001] Clave Y Guaguanco with Celeste Mendoza and Changuito - Noche De La Rumba
 [2001] Changuito - Syncopation
 [2002] Kysha25 (from Italy) LP Culebras - in the song Ambatula
 [2002] Maraca - Tremenda Rumba!
 [2002] Giraldo Piloto - Klimax
 [2004] Diego el Cigala and Bebo Valdés - Lagrimas Negras
 [2005] Kysha25 (from Italy) - LP Farandula
 [2007] Changuito - Telegrafias Sin Hilo

References

Further reading
Jose Luis Quintana "Changuito" (1998) Changuito: A Master's Approach to Timbales, Alfred Publishing Co.,

Performances on YouTube

1948 births
Living people
Cuban percussionists
Conga players
Timbaleros